is a Japanese tokusatsu television series and the 19th installment in the long-running Super Sentai metaseries of superhero programs. It aired from March 3, 1995 to February 23, 1996, replacing Ninja Sentai Kakuranger and was replaced by Gekisou Sentai Carranger. It is the second ancient civilization-themed Super Sentai, preceded by Dai Sentai Goggle-V. Its footage was used in the American series, Power Rangers Zeo (the closing credits of Zeo referred to it as "O Rangers").

In May 2016, Shout! Factory announced that they would release "Chouriki Sentai Ohranger: The Complete Series" on DVD in North America in November 2016. Ohranger was released on DVD in North America on November 1, 2016. This is the fourth Super Sentai set to be released in North America. In addition on September 8, 2017, Shout! streamed the series on their website.

Plot
In the year 1999, the Machine Empire of Baranoia, led by Emperor Bacchushund, invades Earth with the intention of wiping out all human life and bringing about machine rule. Chief of Staff Miura revives super energies that had been born of the lost civilization of Pangaea. Enlisting an elite five-man team of the United Airforce's finest pilots, Miura builds a pyramid to generate Tetrahedron power to allow five UAOH officers to transform into the Ohrangers and stop Baranoia's invasion.

Ohrangers

The Ohrangers (オーレンジャー Ōrenjā) are a group of five soldiers from the UA who battle the Machine Empire Baranoia. They were originally normal humans until their body chemistry was slightly altered to utilize Chouriki, a form of energy used by an ancient civilization dating back to the time when all the continents were Pangaea. Their special team attack is the Chouriki Dynamite Attack (超力ダイナマイトアタック Chōriki Dainamaito Atakku), where the Ohrangers perform multiple mid-air flips and change into an energy ball that destroys Machine Beasts. Their surname bears the number of corners (or in Momo and Juri's case, a circle which has no corners and a = which is just two lines) of their visor's shape, except for Goro's whose surname reflects the shape of his visor (which is a star).

Goro Hoshino 
Goro Hoshino (星野 吾郎 Hoshino Gorō) is a 25-year-old who fights as Oh Red (オーレッド Ō Reddo). An ace pilot and the team UA Captain, Goro is the first to receive his powers. He is a cool-headed and quick-thinking person, though his stubbornness brings him and his teammates much trouble at times. He is an expert in karate, kendo, and judo. The others call him "captain." Goro also appeared in Gaoranger Vs Super Sentai Along with his fellow Red Rangers from Akarenger to Time Red.

Goro appeared years later in Kaizoku Sentai Gokaiger, where he and his partner Momo created a distraction for the Gokaigers while Goro attempted to negotiate with Basco to gain the location of the Zangyack army. When this fell through, Goro was kidnapped by Basco, but was later rescued by the Gokaiger team. He then grants the Greater Power to the Gokaigers, which allows them to create their GokaiGalleon Buster.

Goro is portrayed by: Masaru Shishido (宍戸 勝 Shishido Masaru).

Shouhei Yokkaichi 
Shouhei Yokkaichi (四日市 昌平 Yokkaichi Shōhei) is the 27-year-old second-in-command and a boxer who fights as Oh Green (オーグリーン Ō Gurīn). Shouhei is chosen from the same division as Hoshino. He is cheerful, kind and popular with children but is also serious and disciplined in work, being the oldest. He likes pork ramen and makes delicious gyoza.

As Oh Green, he can attack with Explosive: Mirage Knuckles (爆烈ミラージュナックル Bakuretsu Mirāji Nakkuru).

Shouhei is portrayed by Kunio Masaoka (正岡 邦夫 Masaoka Kunio).

Yuji Mita 
Yuji Mita (三田 祐司 Mita Yūji) is a 21-year-old who fights as Oh Blue (オーブルー Ō Burū). A swift person, Yuji is an expert in fencing and gymnastics. His recklessness makes him the most childish member along with his way of speaking. Yuji uses jumps and mid air fighting tactics.

As Oh Blue, he can attack with Crashing: Rolling Bomber (激突ローリングボンバー Gekitotsu Rōringu Bonbā).

Yuji is portrayed by Masashi Goda (合田 雅吏 Gōda Masashi).

Juri Nijou 
Juri Nijou, UA Lieutenant (二条 樹里 Nijō Juri) is a 22-year-old who fights as Oh Yellow (オーイエロー Ō Ierō). Juri uses martial arts researched in the United States but she also likes dancing and aerobics, which uses in battle with great results. She loves fashion.

As Oh Yellow, she can attack with Lightspeed: Splash Illusion (光速スプラッシュイリュージョン Kōsoku Supurasshu Iryūjon).

Juri is portrayed by Ayumi Hodaka (穂高 あゆみ Hodaka Ayumi) [Played as Ayumi Aso (麻生 あゆみ Asō Ayumi)].

Momo Maruo 
Momo Maruo, UA Lieutenant (丸尾 桃 Maruo Momo) is 20 years old, youngest in the team who uses Chinese boxing and aikido and fights as Oh Pink (オーピンク Ō Pinku). While separated from the others during the Bara Magma incident and losing her Power Brace, Momo is befriended by a German Shepherd named Johnny, referred by the locals as a divine savior, who brought her to safety. With the help of Shouta, Momo finds Johnny with her Power Brace. She took Johnny's death hard as she avenges his death, only to find that he was still alive.

Momo appeared in Kaizoku Sentai Gokaiger and led the Gokaigers to believe she had in her possession the Greater Power of the Ohrangers, and would give it to the Gokaigers freely if they did errands for her. This was later revealed to be a ruse to keep the Gokaigers distracted.

As Oh Pink, she can attack with Flashing: Miracle Chi Kung Shot (閃光ミラクル気功弾 Senkō Mirakuru Kikōdan).

Momo is portrayed by Tamao Satō (さとう 珠緒 Satō Tamao) [Played as Tamao (珠緒)].

Allies

Naoyuki Miura 
Chief of Staff Naoyuki Miura  (三浦 尚之参謀長 Miura Naoyuki-sanbōchō) is the commander of Ohrangers and a dedicated leader who refuses to give up no matter what. An anthropologist and scientist as well, he learned of the ancient Pangaean civilization in 1996 and reversed engineered Chouriki to create the Ohrangers' arsenal and mecha when they are needed. He once defeated a Baranoia Soldier with his bare hands after a UA soldier couldn't do it with a gun.

Miura is portrayed by tokusatsu actor Hiroshi Miyauchi (宮内 洋 Miyauchi Hiroshi).

Dorin 
The Dorin (ドリン Dorin, 26–31, 36, 42, 46–48) were the god-like people of Pangaea which one was found sleeping inside King Pyramider. It is discovered that she is an important part of the Chouriki in Earth and Riki is assigned to her care. She was killed by Multiwa but revived in the finale. She has a green pet lizard named Paku (パク Paku).

Dorin is portrayed by Lisa Wada (和田 理沙 Wada Risa).

Gunmajin 
Gunmajin (ガンマジン Ganmajin, 37, 38, 40, 41, 44, 48 & Ohranger vs. Kakuranger) is an ancient warrior known for his honor and courage. According to Riki, Gunmajin appeared once 600 million years ago. Imprisoned within the form of a tiny tiki, the only way to unlock his power is by placing a key into his forehead and reciting the magic words "Gunma Gunma Dondoko Gunma" (ガンマガンマ ドンドコガンマ Ganma Ganma Dondoko Ganma). For some reason, the key always ended up in the hands of a child and everyone knew the magic words after hearing them. When awakened, Gunmajin would grant a single wish to his discoverer as long as it didn't mean harm to anyone. There were times in which he simply didn't like the wish and refused to grant it or punished his awakener for lying to him. Gunmajin possessed the Mazin Saber (マジンサーベル Majin Sāberu) through which he focused his power into the Majin One Sword Style (マジン一刀流 Majin Ittō Ryū) of Majin One Sword Fencing (Fire, Lightning, Wind, and Light). His back can act as a shield to defend himself and others (even King Pyramider's beam). In the series finale, he took Acha, Kocha, and Buldont, Jr. to his care. In Ohranger vs. Kakuranger, he is revealed to be terrified of Youkai (monsters fought by the Kakurangers).

Gunmajin is voiced by Akira Kamiya (神谷 明 Kamiya Akira).

Shunpei Kirino 
Shunpei Kirino (桐野 俊平 Kirino Shunpei) was a U.A. Lieutenant who died trying to control the Red Puncher.

Kirino was played by Kei Shindachiya (信達谷圭 Shindachiya Kei), who played Ken Hoshikawa in Chikyuu Sentai Fiveman

Kotaro Henna 
Kotaro Henna (辺名 小太郎 Henna Kotaro, 25, 29 & 30) is a crazed robot expert who unintentionally causes trouble while wanting to see what makes Baranoia tick.

Arsenal 

 Power Brace (パワーブレス Pawā Buresu): The Ohrangers' changing device. One piece is worn on each wrist. The right-armed piece has a Storage Crystal (ストレージクリスタル Sutorēji Kurisutaru), the source of the Ohrangers' energy, attached to it. The Storage Crystal is also placed inside of the cockpit of Ohranger Robo in order to pilot it. The left piece also can work as a communication device to contact UA's home base, and to contact the other Rangers. By using the call "Super-Powered Transformation!" (超力変身! Chōriki Henshin!) and connecting their braces, the user transforms into an Ohranger.
 Thunderwings (サンダーウィング Sandā Wingu): Air force fighter jets piloted by UAOH members.
 Jetter Machines: Five motorcycles that serve as the Ohrangers' personal transportation. Can be stored into the Thunderwings until they are needed.
 Red Jetter (レッドジェッター Reddo Jettā): Oh Red's motorcycle.
 Green Jetter (グリーンジェッター Gurīn Jettā): Oh Green's motorcycle.
 Blue Jetter (ブルージェッター Burū Jettā): Oh Blue's motorcycle.
 Yellow Jetter (イエロージェッター Ierō Jettā): Oh Yellow's motorcycle.
 Pink Jetter (ピンクジェッター Pinku Jettā): Oh Pink's motorcycle.
 King Smasher (キングスマッシャー Kingu Sumasshā): A combination of the Battle Stick and King Blaster.
 Battle Stick (バトルスティック Batoru Sutikku): Batons wielded by the Ohrangers. Can be used in the "Battle Stick Hurricane" team attack.
 King Blaster (キングブラスター Kingu Burasutā): Laser pistols wielded by the Ohrangers. They can be combined with the Ohrangers' other various weapons to form even more powerful tools.
 Star Riser (スターライザー Sutā Raizā): A sword wielded by Oh Red; special attack is Secret Sword: Super-Powered Riser (秘剣・超力ライザー Hiken - Chōriki Raizā).
 Square Crusher (スクエアクラッシャー Sukuea Kurasshā): A pair of hatchets wielded by Oh Green; special attack is Lightning: Super-Powered Crushers (電光・超力クラッシャー Denkō - Chōriki Kurasshā).
 Delta Tonfa (デルタトンファ Deruta Tonfa): A pair of bladed tonfa wielded by Oh Blue; special attack is Lightning: Super-Powered Tonfas (稲妻・超力トンファ Inazuma - Chōriki Tonfa).
 Twin Batons (ツインバトン Tsuin Baton): A pair of nunchaku wielded by Oh Yellow; special attack is Explosion: Super-Powered Baton (炸裂・超力バトン Sakuretsu - Chōriki Baton).
 Circle Defenser (サークルディフェンサー Sākuru Difensā): A shield wielded by Oh Pink; special attack is Hurricane: Super-Powered Defenser (疾風・超力ディフェンサー Shippū - Chōriki Difensā).
 Big Bang Buster (ビッグバンバスター Biggu Ban Basutā): A special combination of the main five Ohrangers' weapons and a King Smasher. The weapon is used to destroy normal-sized Machine Beasts.
 Giant Roller (ジャイアントローラー Jaianto Rōrā): A giant wheel stored inside Sky Phoenix, used by Oh Red to destroy normal-sized Machine Beasts.
 Ole Bazooka (オーレバズーカ Ōre Bazūka): A cannon loaded with Hyper Storage Crystals (ハイパーストレージクリスタル Haipā Sutorēji Kurisutaru) that is used to finish off Machine Beasts.
 King Brace (キングブレス Kingu Buresu): Riki/King Ranger's transformation device that was served as the basis of the Ohranger's Power Brace. Gold-colored (as opposed to the silver-colored Power Brace) with a Storage Crystal with a "king" (王 Ō) shape. The transformation call is the same as the other Ohrangers.
 King Stick (キングスティック Kingu Sutikku): A staff given to Riki by Dorin upon their arrival. Special attacks are King Victory Flash (キングヴィクトリーフラッシュ Kingu Vikutorī Furasshu} and King Tornado (キングトルネード Kingu Torunēdo).

Mecha 
The mecha constructed by UA are used by the Ohrangers to fight Baranoia.

Chouriki Mobiles 
The Chouriki Mobiles (超力モビル Chōriki Mobiru) consists of the following:

 Sky Phoenix (スカイフェニックス Sukai Fenikkusu): A red phoenix Chouriki Mobile piloted by Oh Red which uses the Phoenix Beam and carries the Giant Roller which he delivers to battles so Oh Red can use him to destroy normal-sized Machine Beasts. It forms Ohranger Robo's head, back, and Wing Head helmet. Sky Phoenix would later help out in Gaoranger vs. Super Sentai.
 Gran Taurus (グランタウラス Guran Taurasu): A green bull Chouriki Mobile piloted by Oh Green which carries Dogu Lander into battle. It is armed with the Taurus Beam and can ram enemies with his Taurus Attack. It forms Ohranger Robo's hips and the Horn Head.
 Dash Leon (ダッシュレオン Dasshu Reon): A blue sphinx Chouriki Mobile piloted by Oh Blue which carries Moa Loader into battle. It is armed with the Leon Shot in his forehead and can bite opponents with its Leon Crush attack. It forms Ohranger Robo's torso, arms, and the Graviton Head.
 Dogu Lander (ドグランダー Dogu Randā): A yellow dogū Chouriki Mobile piloted by Oh Yellow which is carried into battle by Gran Taurus. It is armed with the dual Dogu Vulcans on its head and side-mounted cannons. It forms Ohranger Robo's left leg and the Vulcan Head.
 Moa Loader (モアローダー Moa Rōdā): A pink moai Chouriki Mobile piloted by Oh Pink which is carried into battle by Dash Leon. It is armed with the Moa Cannon on his head and side-mounted missile launchers. It forms Ohranger Robo's right leg and the Cannon Head.

Blocker Robos 
The Blocker Robos (ブロッカーロボ Burokkā Robo) are giant robots that are shaped as geometric shapes, respective to their Ohranger pilot's symbol, arriving at the command "Blocker Robos, launch!". Each individual Blocker Robo can wield giant-sized versions of the Battle Stick and King Blaster, and the Ohranger's main weapons.

 Red Blocker (レッドブロッカー Reddo Burokkā): The red star-shaped blocker piloted by Oh Red. Armed with the Star Head Attack (スターヘッドアタック Sutā Heddo Atakku) and Red Star Fire.
 Green Blocker (グリーンブロッカー Gurīn Burokkā): The green square-shaped blocker piloted by Oh Green. Armed with the Green Body Attack (グリーンボディアタック Gurīn Bodi Atakku) and Green Enclose Net. Capable of operating underwater.
 Blue Blocker (ブルーブロッカー Burū Burokkā): The blue triangle-shaped blocker piloted by Oh Blue. Armed with the Blue Kick (ブルーキック Burū Kikku) and Blue Freezing Storm.
 Yellow Blocker (イエローブロッカー Ierō Burokkā): The yellow equal sign-shaped blocker piloted by Oh Yellow. Armed with the Yellow Spinning Kick (イエロースプニングキック Ierō Supuningu Kikku) and Yellow Lightning Flash.
 Pink Blocker (ピンクブロッカー Pinku Burokkā): The circle-shaped blocker piloted by Oh Pink. Armed with the Pink Skyline Chop (ピンクスカイラインチョップ Pinku Sukairain Choppu) and Pink Impact Wave.

Ohranger Robo 
Super-Powered Combination Ohranger Robo (超力合体オーレンジャーロボ Chōriki Gattai Ōrenjā Robo) is the primary mecha formed by the Chouriki Mobiles. The Ohranger Robo is a unique robot because of its interchangeable "Helmets", one for each of the five separate vehicles, with one core member positioning themselves in the center cockpit usually switching his/her place with Oh Red depending on whose vehicle is being used as helmet:

 The default Wing Head (ウィングヘッド Wingu Heddo) allows Ohranger Robo to use the Super Crown Sword (スーパークラウンソード Sūpā Kuraun Sōdo) for its Crown Final Crash (クラウンファイナルクラッシュ Kuraun Fainaru Kurasshu), Chouriki Crown Sword Shoot (超力クラウンソードシュート Chōriki Kuraun Sōdo Shūto), and Chouriki Crown Spark Shield (超力クラウンスパークシールド Chōriki Kuraun Supāku Shīrudo) attacks.
 The Horn Head (ホーンヘッド Hōn Heddo) allows Ohranger Robo to execute the Taurus Dive headbutt and Super-Powered Taurus Thunder (超力タウラスサンダー Chōriki Taurasu Sandā) attacks.
 The Graviton Head (グラビトンヘッド Gurabiton Heddo) allows Ohranger Robo to execute the Leon Punch (レオンパンチ Reon Panchi) and Chouriki Leon Beam (超力レオンビーム Chōriki Reon Bīmu) attacks.
 The Vulcan Head (バルカンヘッド Barukan Heddo) allows Ohranger Robo to execute the Chouriki Jump Crash (超力ジャンプクラッシュ Chōriki Janpu Kurasshu), Dogu Sky Kick (ドグスカイキック Dogu Sukai Kikku) and Chouriki Dogu Vulcan (超力ドグバルカン Chouriki Dogu Barukan) attacks. 
 The Cannon Head (キャノンヘッド Kyanon Heddo) allows Ohranger Robo to execute the Moa Tornado (モアトルネード Moa Torunēdo) and Chouriki Moa Cannon (超力モアキャノン Chōriki Moa Kyanon) attacks.

Red Puncher 
Red Puncher (レッドパンチャー Reddo Panchā) was the first mecha built by UA, built prior to Baranoia Invasion in 1997. When Baranoia begins its invasion, the Red Puncher was piloted by a UAOH Lieutenant named Shunpei Kirino. However, Miura still couldn't control the Chouriki energy needed to control it. Shunpei died as Red Puncher is buried under boulders as a result of its berserker rage. When Bara Builder damaged Ohranger Robo, Goro found where Red Puncher was buried and managed to gain control. Arrives by the command "Red Puncher, go!" and can execute the Puncher Gatling (パンチャーガトリング Panchā Gatoringu) and Magna Puncher (マグナパンチャー Maguna Panchā) attacks.

In the finale, Red Puncher is captured by Baranoia, but it is freed by Gunmazin.

Buster Ohranger Robo 
Artillery Combination Buster Ohranger Robo (超砲撃合体バスターオーレンジャーロボ Chōhōgeki Gattai Basutā Ōrenjā Robo) is the combination of Ohranger Robo and Red Puncher. Red Puncher is able to assume Combination Mode to form Buster Ohranger Robo, forming the posterior and "Buster Head" (バスターヘッド Basutā Heddo).

It can use the two large shoulder cannons to destroy Machine Beasts with its Big Cannon Burst (ビッグキャノンバースト Biggu Kyanon Bāsuto) finisher.

King Pyramider 
King Pyramider (キングピラミッダー Kingu Piramiddā) is King Ranger's mecha, with Riki and Dorin placed in suspended animation until King Pyramider returns to Earth several millennia later. It is a massive Pyramid that can cloak itself until summoned by King Ranger. Its primary attack is a powerful lightning attack that is summoned from the sky called Super Burn Wave (スーパーバーンウェーブ Sūpā Bān Wēbu). King Pyramidder's true power can be seen when it convert to either Carrier Formation (キャリアフォーメーション Kyaria Fōmēshon) or to a gigantic robot, Battle Formation (バトルフォーメーション Batoru Fōmēshon) and is able to carry either the Chouriki Mobiles or Oh Blocker, as well as the Red Puncher. The finisher for the Battle Formation is the Super Legend Beam (スーパーレジェンドビーム Sūpā Rejendo Bīmu) barrage. It transforms into either form whenever the commands "King Pyramider, Carrier Formation!" or "King Pyramider, Battle Formation!" are given. The bases of the left and right sides become the arms, the black section of the front becomes the feet as the legs are revealed, and the back side shows a black pyramid that becomes the head (the lower half of the front side shows the face).

Oh Blocker 
Super-Heavy Fusion Oh Blocker (超重合体オーブロッカー Chōjū Gattai Ō Burokkā) is made up of the Blocker Robos. Red Blocker forms Oh Blocker's body. Green Blocker forms Oh Blocker's lower legs. Blue Blocker forms Oh Blocker's waist and upper legs. Yellow Blocker forms Oh Blocker's head, shoulders, and arms. Pink Blocker forms Oh Blocker's feet. Sometimes it can be launched fully combined at the command of "Oh Blocker, launch!".

Oh Blocker wields the Twin Blocken Swords (ツインブロッケンソード Tsuin Burokken Sōdo), with which it performs the Twin Blocken Thunder (ツインブロッケンサンダー Tsuin Burokken Sandā) and the Twin Blocken Crash (ツインブロッケンクラッシュ Tsuin Burokken Kurasshu) finisher. It can also fire a beam from its forehead.

In the finale, Oh Blocker is captured by Baranoia, but it is freed by Gunmazin, and piloted by King Ranger.

Tackle Boy 
Tackle Boy (タックルボーイ Takkuru Bōi) is a massive American Football Player robot, yet a dwarf compared to the other robots. It converts to a massive wheel (the back of the wheel is the feet, which reveals the head, and the sides are the arms). Comes when given the command, "Tackle Boy, launch!".

Artificially intelligent, Tackle Boy can be thrown by Oh Blocker for the Dynamite Tackle (ダイナマイトタックル Dainamaito Takkuru) finisher.

Machine Empire Baranoia 
The  is a cruel race of machines out to conquer Earth. It is led by Bacchushund and possesses a vast army. It had already conquered an entire chain of galaxies before reaching Earth.

Bacchus Wrath 
Emperor Bacchus Wrath (皇帝バッカスフンド Kōtei Bakkasuhundo, 1-34, 39 & 40) is the ruler of Baranoia, built 600 million years ago by an ancient race. He turned to evil and was banished into the depths of space by King Ranger. Seeing himself as a god, Bacchus Wrath believes he has all right to conquer the world and make humans into his slaves. Very violent, tending to malfunction when he goes berserk, Bacchus Wrath does not tolerate failure nor sentimentality in his minions' programming.

In episode 33, it's later revealed Bacchus Wrath had secretly been rebuilding some of his Machine Beasts and managed to harness the infinite energy from the Earth's magma. When his rebuilt Machine Beasts passed through the magma shower they became Super Machine Beasts. Thanks to the Ohrangers' "Trojan Horse" plan with the Blocker Robos, this facility was destroyed preventing any more Super Machine Beasts from being created. In episode 34, he grows in size and power thanks to the power of a space metal dark sword which, according to him, was the only one of its kind in the universe, which he intended to use on the Ohrangers. He is finally destroyed by Oh Blocker. But Bacchus Wrath's head survives and gives the last of his energy to Buldont before shutting down for good.

Bacchus Wrath is voiced by Tōru Ōhira (大平 透 Ōhira Tōru).

Hysteria 
Empress Hysteria (皇妃ヒステリア Kōhi Hisuteria, 1-41) is the wife of Bacchushund, usually remaining in the palace devising plans with her husband, though she does go down to Earth by herself at times. She usually carries a metal fan with her and also a gun. She initially despised humans for their feelings, but began to value life after Bomber the Great assumes command. Her body color changed from gold to silver when she gave all her power to her niece Multiwa, and as a result, she aged into Dowager Empress Hysteria (41, 47 & 48), now using what is left of her late husband's staff as a cane. She eventually self-destructs in order to protect her grandchild, sacrificing herself after the Ohrangers promised they would not harm the child.

Hysteria is voiced by Minori Matsushima (松島みのり, Matsushima Minori).

Buldont 
Prince Buldont (皇子ブルドント Ōji Burudonto, 1-40) is basically a robot child and son of Bacchus Wrath and Hysteria. Mischievous and spoiled, he thought of humans as simple toys. He once attempted to direct his own movie, "Century of the Machine Empire", by using humans with no notion that they die from the realism. He can fire lasers from his eyes. After his father's death, Buldont challenges Bomber the Great to a duel for the throne of Baranoia and loses with his body taken away by the exiled Hysteria. However, finding his father's head and receiving his remaining energy, Buldont reconfigured into the adult form of Kaiser Buldont (カイザーブルドント Kaizā Burudonto, 40–48). After returning to Baranoia and destroying Bomber the Great, Buldont regains the leadership of Baranoia. He and Multiwa make themselves grow without Acha and Kocha's help, but is eventually destroyed in the series finale at the hands of King Pyramidder Battle Formation.

Buldont is voiced by Tomokazu Seki (関 智一 Seki Tomokazu).

Multiwa 
Princess Multiwa (マルチーワ姫 Maruchīwa Hime, 40–48) is Hysteria's niece and Buldont's cousin, skilled with a bow that can become a sword. While Bacchushund revives Buldont, Hysteria decides to do the same and sends all her 600 million year worth energy to Multiwa who was sleeping on another planet waiting for the day to become the Machine Empress. Receiving the energy from her Aunt and a message of help she came to Earth interrupting the battle between Bomber and the Ohrangers. She aids Buldont in disfiguring Bomber and reprograming him into their slave before sending him to his death. The two marry after Buldont becomes the new ruler of Baranoia. She and Buldont make themselves grow without Acha and Kocha's help. She eventually dies by her husband's side at the hands of King Pyramidder Battle Formation's Super Legend Beam, but not before she bears him a son.

Multiwa is voiced by Miho Yamada (山田 美穂 Yamada Miho).

Buldont Jr. 
Buldont Jr. (ブルドントＪｒ． Burudonto Junia, 47 & 48) is Kaiser Buldont and Princess Multiwa's child. After his birth, his parents are destroyed by King Pyramider and his grandmother Empress Hysteria sacrifices herself after the Ohrangers promise her not to harm the child. The Ohrangers hand Buldont Jr. over to Gunmajin just before he departs to his own planet.

Bomber the Great 
Bomber the Great (ボンバー・ザ・グレート Bonbā za Gurēto, 35–41), known as the "Universal Bomb Bastard" (宇宙の爆弾野郎 Uchū no Bakudan Yarō). was just another one of Baranoia's Machine Beasts, yet was able to turn his entire body into a missile. He was exiled after a failed attempt to take over the Baranoia Empire, only to return upon hearing of the death of Bacchushund to try to retake over. This time he set his sights on trying to take over the empty throne. After revising the Baranoian Constitution, Art 12, Bomber challenged Buldont to a duel for the Empire which he won and banished Buldont, proclaiming himself "Bomber the Great the 1st, new Emperor of Baranoia".

At first, being new to the throne, Bomber did his best at leading the Empire, trying to win Hysteria's affections and to kill the Ohrangers in the process, but consistently met with failure in both prospects, exiling Hysteria as a result. Kaiser Buldont returned to take back his birthright and Multiwa took control of Bomber by reprogramming him after they took out his arms, replacing them with a sword and a bunker. Bomber was soon sent on a suicide mission to kill the Ohrangers, but was destroyed by King Pyramider Battle Formation (Oh Blocker) before he could accomplish this. Suddenly, a smaller missile called the Great Missile appeared shortly afterward, to destroy the sun, only to be flung towards the other side of space by Gunmajin to be destroyed for good.

Bomber the Great is voiced by Nobuyuki Hiyama (檜山 修之 Hiyama Nobuyuki).

Servants

Acha 
Butler Acha (執事アチャ Shitsuji Acha) is Baranoia's Imperial Family Butler who follows whoever is in command at the time, reading their War Declaration and other proclamations. Took care of young Buldont when in the field, even serving as the producer of his movie. But for all his work, Acha never gets any respect from the imperial family who abuse him at times. When Bomber the Great took over, he simply forgot about Hysteria and served him. When Buldont returned, the same happened, Acha couldn't care less about Bomber. At the end of the series, he turned good and went with Kocha, and Buldont Jr., and Gunmajin back to Gunmajin's planet.

Acha is voiced by Kaneta Kimotsuki (肝付 兼太 Kimotsuki Kaneta).

Kocha 
Butler Kocha (執事コチャ Shitsuji Kocha) is a miniature robot who served the family along Acha, always on her partner's shoulder like a pirate captain's parrot. Though not much of a figure due to her size, Kocha can fire beams from her chest. In episode 8, Kocha was outfitted with the Giant System, enabling her to become a hammer for Acha to fling at a Machine Beast, transmitting an enlarging beam into it. At the series finale, Kocha was taken by Gunmajin back to Gunmajin's home planet.

Kocha is voiced by Shinobu Adachi (安達 忍 Adachi Shinobu).

Keris 
Machine Beast Tamer Keris (マシン獣使いケリス Mashinjū Tsukai Kerisu, 26–28) is an Officer placed in charge of taming feral Machine Beasts, having her personal dome. When Bacchus Wrath learns of Riki's return, he frantically requests her aid by having her go after Dorin with Yuji, Juri, and Momo attempting to protect her. But after King Ranger arrives and destroys Bara Goblin, Keris assumes her true buxom form as she enlarges and captures King Ranger before taking into her domain. She then uses Bara King to capture little girls in order to make them her new pets after splicing them with animal DNA, with Dorin as the crown jewel in her collection. However, an eagle hinders Keris from capturing Dorin at the cost of its life as the Ohrangers arrive to the girl's aid. Enlarging into her true form, Keris traps Ohranger Robo in an electrified cage until King Pyramider frees it, with OhRed saving the girls before calling in Red Puncher. Keris is then destroyed by King Pyramider Battle Formation.

Keris is played by Akiko Amamatsuri (天祭 揚子 Amamatsuri Akiko), who previously played Rui Senda/Dr. Mazenda in Choujuu Sentai Liveman and Gara in Gosei Sentai Dairanger.

Camera Trick 
Camera Trick (カメラトリック Kamera Torikku, Movie, 26, 27 & 39) is a small bird-resembling video camera monster, serving as a recon for Baranoia's forces.

Camera Trick is voiced by Kazunori Arai (新井 一典 Arai Kazunori).

Sei'ichi Kuroda 
Sei'ichi Kuroda (新田一郎 Kuroda Sei'ichi, 17 & 18): A robotics scientist who stole Yuji's Power Brace so he could power his android son Shigeru, whom he built in the image of his dead son. Furthermore, because he cares more for machines than people, he allied himself with Baranoia in a shaky alliance of sorts. But once the actions of Bara Vacuum exposed Shigeru's true nature, Kuroda offer Bacchus Wrath the power of Chouriki in return for a permanent means to keep Shigeru active along with being viceroy of the Baranoian-ruled Earth. Converted into a cyborg, Kuroda captures the Ohrangers one by one while integrating Shigeru into his systems. However, Shigeru manages to break free and free the others. As a result, Bara Ivy is activated to kill them all as Kuroda sacrifices himself so the Ohrangers can get Shigeru out of harm's way.

Machine Army

Barlo Soldiers 
Barlo Soldiers (バーロ兵 Bāro Hei): Mass-produced android troops of the Machine Empire of Baranoia. Their movements and general behavior are similar to that of monkeys. They have sticks, that can extend into battle staffs or spears and give off an electric shock, as weapons and their heads can open so they can throw cutter discs or nets from their mouths and energy blasts from their eyes. They pilot the Octopus jet fighters.

Takonpas 
Takonpas (タコンパス Takonpasu): Octopus-like Jet fighters which could switch to a "walking" mode, usually piloted by the Barlo Soldiers. Octopus fighters seems to be a direct homage to the Martian Tripods in H.G. Wells' novel, War of the Worlds.

Baracticas 
Baracticas (バラクティカ Barakutika): Battleships in the shape of gears, they can hold up to hundreds of Takonpas and are the means of transportation from Baranoia to Earth.

Machine Beasts 
Built on the dark side of the Moon by Baranoia, the Machine Beasts (マシン獣 Mashinjū) are the main weapons used for Earth's invasion. There would be different types of Machine Beasts, from mindless weapons of destruction to robots with intelligence or feelings superior to that of humans.

 Bara Drill (バラドリル Bara Doriru, 1, 33): The first Machine Beast to be sent to Earth, able to fold its limbs into its body to move. Attacking Shoichi and his group after they are derailed from joining the Ohranger program, Bara Drill is stopped by Goro as he became Oh Red and single-handedly destroys the monster. A second giant Bara Drill was later built into a Super Machine Beast, only to be destroyed by Green Blocker.
 Bara Saucer (バラソーサー Bara Sōsā, 2, 33): A giant Machine Beast with tentacle arms that Baranoia sent to destroy Tokyo when their demands are not met. Bara Saucer rampaged until the assembled Ohrangers arrive with OhRed and OhGreen holding the Machine Beast while the others save teacher and her students. Managing to hack the giant apart with their weapons, the Ohrangers finish Bara Saucer off with the Big Bang Buster. A second giant Bara Saucer was built as a Super Machine Beast, only to be destroyed by Blue Blocker.
 Bara Vanish (バラバニッシュ Bara Banisshu, 3, 33): A land mine-like Machine Beast sent to Earth in retaliation for the Ohrangers' debut by targeting a boy named Kenichi Matsumoto in a scheme to reverse engineer Chouriki from his memories of a part of a Pangaean slab he and his father found. Equipped with a solar-powered sensor, Bara Vanish is able to turn itself invisible to get an advantage over its opponents in sunlit areas. After Oh Red heavily damages it when about to access Kenichi's memories, disabling its invisibility, Bara Vanish is destroyed by the Big Bang Buster. A second giant Bara Vanish is built to become a Super Machine Beast, but was destroyed before the process was completed.
 Bara Crusher (バラクラッシャー Bara Kurasshā, 4, 33): A ravenous Machine Beast brought to Earth by Acha as part of the Human/Machine Beast hybridization plan by using the monster's Metal Amoebas to convert any organic being into a clone of itself. Once on Earth, Bara Crusher ends up in the boiler room of an apartment building before the Ohrangers find it. Though destroyed by the King Smashers, Bara Crusher bit a police officer named Officer Otani just prior to its death, infecting the man as he became the new Bara Crusher and kidnaps his son Hiroshi and four other children to infect them. But the Ohrangers interfere as Officer Otani regains himself and attempts suicide to protect Hiroshi before the Machine Beast manifests again. Learning of Bara Crusher's fear of fire, Oh Red uses it to force the Metal Amoeba out of Officer Otani's body and blast it to bits. A third giant Bara Crusher was built in 33 as a Super Machine Beast, only to be destroyed by Yellow and Pink Blockers.
 Bara Cactus 1 & 2 (バラカクタス Bara Kakutasu 1 & 2, 5): Brother cactoid robots who are loyal to each other, able to disburse a pollen that causes humans to become mindless machine creatures able to gain the ability from whatever they eat. Arriving to Earth first, Bara Cactus 1 used his pollen to infect a boy named Takashi before using it on other humans. Once his younger Bara Cactus 2 arrives, the brothers overwhelm the Ohrangers with their power until Bara Cactus 1 notices Takashi being protected by his older brother Tsuyoshi and is confused of seeing the same sibling loyalty he and his brother have. Summoned back to the Baranoia Moon Base, Bara Cactus 1 is scolded for his sentimentality as he is ordered to deal with the Ohrangers alone or Bara Cactus 2 would be destroyed. With Takeshi supporting him, Bara Cactus 1 overpowers the Ohrangers until Tsuyoshi snaps his brother out of it as the two and Yuji uses the Star Riser to run the Machine Beast through. Though Bara Cactus 1 survived both the stab and then the King Smashers, he returned to the Baranoia Moon Base to find that his brother has been dismantled. He was then blown up into pieces by Bacchus Wrath himself, who deems him and his brother as failed creations.
 Bara Brain (バラブレイン Bara Burein, 6 & 7): A cunning Machine Beast who is a psychic. Hysteria sends him to target Chief Miura, probing his mind to get him through the daughter of Miura's deceased UA comrade Mitsuko Endo. Separating them, Bara Brain creates Bara Separate as he assumes a sphere form to take control of Mitsuko, capturing Chief Miura and using his guilt to trick him into revealing the location of the UA base. Annoyed, Bara Brain changes plans to threats of killing Mitsuko with his telekinesis if Miura refuses to comply. But OhRed, OhGreen, and OhYellow arrive to save Miura and Mitsuko with Bara Brain in pursuit of the former. Capturing Miura, Bara Brain threatened the Ohrangers to show themselves before noon. But the Ohrangers arrive in the completed Chouriki Mobiles, with Bara Brain piloting a Takompas to battle OhRed in the Sky Phoenix. In the end, Bara Brain died in conjunction with Bara Separate due being linked mentally to it.
 Bara Separate (バラセパレート Bara Separēto, 6 & 7): Originally Bara Brain's right eye, the sphere-like Bara Separate enlarges and assimilates surrounding vehicle matter to assume a Machine Beast form, able to radiate destructive lightning and fire powerful blasts from its arms. The top segment of the star on his back could detach and transform into a boomerang of destructive energy. Separate also had the ability to transform into a large metal sphere, making it practically invulnerable to any attack. Being too powerful, the Oh Blue and Oh Pink are forced to use Dash Leon and Mao Loader while the others rescue Miura. But Bara Separate defeats them before pursuing is Miura when Oh Red attempts to get him out of harm's way. Completing the Chouriki Mobiles, the Ohrangers take out the Octopus before forming Ohranger Robo and scrap Bara Separate's sphere before it could rebuilt itself.
 Bara Missiler (バラミサイラー Bara Misairā, 8, 33): Bara Missiler comes from the army on the planet Daurora, capable of flying at extreme speeds and could operate in outer space. Summoned to attack the city from a distance with the missiles he fires from his arms and shoulders, he lures the Ohrangers to the open before Oh Red wounds him. But Bara Missiler is made a giant by Acha and Kocha, overpowering Ohranger Robo before firing chains from his torso to drag the mecha and its pilots into the sun's gravitational field. But using the Head system, the Ohrangers escape death with Ohranger Robo destroying Bara Missiler with Crown Final Crash. Another giant Bara Missiler is built as a Super Machine Beast before being destroyed by Red Blocker.
 Steampunk (スチームパンク Suchīmupanku, Movie): A robotic train monster who says "baby" in his sentences and could turn into an actual train. Steam Punk was created when all the monsters in the movie fused together into one monster, abducting the children due to being a weak monster. Once he lost his leverage, Steam Punk shrank and attempted to escape on a train track. But, Ohranger Robo sliced the track apart with Super Crown Crash, with Steam Punk unable to stop as he fell to his death below.
 Locker Knight (ロッカーナイト Mashinju Rokkānaito): A robotic shower-head monster that rides on horseback and use his rod to fire lightning.
 Cat Signal (ネコシグナル Nekoshigunaru): A robotic traffic sign monster with cat ears, who uses an oil lantern and keychains as weapons and can fire a beam from his eye.
 Kabochumpkin (カボチャンプキン Kabochanpukin): A robotic Jack O'Lantern/witch monster, he uses a broom as a weapon.
 Jagchuck (ジャグチャック Jaguchakku): A robotic faucet-themed monster, able to extend his mouth and fire water from the faucet on his belly or his mouth. Was rebuilt into the stronger Machine Beast: Bara Jaguchi (バラジャグチ Bara Jaguchi, 31), only to be killed by King Pyramider Battle Formation.
 Bara Darts (バラダーツ Bara Dātsu, 9, 33): A scorpion-themed Machine Beast who able to shoot Poison Darts on his tail, causing the target to be infected with a rusting poison. Sent to disable the Ohrangers' ability to use the Ohranger Robo, Bara Darts infects Goro, Shouhei and Yuji through trickery. But when Momo and Juri arrive to beat the Machine Beast for taking out their male teammates, he reveals be in possession of an antidote before Juri offers to work for Bara Darts, winning the Machine Beast's trust by going after Momo and attempts to kill her. However, it all turned out to be a farce by Juri to weasel the antidote into her hands by faking being accidentally hit by a Poison Dart, only to learn she was given a fake container. But Momo uses a hologram to trick Bara Darts in giving the real antidote. After playing football keep away with Acha and the Baras, Momo takes the antidote to the guys while Juri holds off their pursuers. Arriving to Juri's aid in full force, the Ohranger men take out the Baras while the female members double team Bara Darts before being defeated Oh Red's sword. But after being enlarged by Kocha, Bara Darts battles Ohranger Robo and is weaken by robot's Vulcan and Cannon Head configurations before being scrapped by the Crown Final Crash. Another giant Bara Darts was built to become a Super Machine Beast, but was destroyed before it could become one.
 Bara Hacker (バラハッカー Bara Hakkā, 10): A computer Machine Beast able to upload a wide array of weapons at his disposal from saws to bombs. On Buldont's suggestion, Bara Hacker is sent to hack into the UA database to access vital info on the Ohrangers' Chouriki Mobiles. Though unable to get the Chouriki Mobile data, Bara Hacker accessed the Ohrangers' arsenal and thus can counter any of the Ohrangers' current weapons. Bara Hacker then proceed to take control of all digital processes in the city, causing anarchy as a result as part of a distraction to access the Chouriki Mobile data at the databank. However, Bara Hacker fell into the Ohrangers' trap and counters their King Smashers and then the Big Bang Buster. However, the Oh Red uses the newly introduced Giant Roller to defeat Bara Hacker, who had no data for him to devise a counter against. Once enlarged by Kocha, Bara Hacker battles Ohranger Robo and is overwhelmed by Horn and Graviton Head configurations with his screen shattered before being scrapped by the Crown Final Crash.
 Bara Printer (バラプリンター Bara Purintā, 11, 33): A Machine Beast known as the Baranoian matchmaker, able to scan an image of an object and use it to make people fall in love with it. When seeing that humans took their everyday appliances for granted, Hysteria summoned Bara Printer to use his beam to cause his human victims to fall in love over their appliances. He battles the Ohrangers when they catch wind of his scheme, driving them off as a result. When Hysteria calls for a change of plans to make humans fall for Baranoia and use them to do their dirty work, Acha is sent to see it through. However, Shouhei plays on Acha's own desire to be appreciated for his hard work, convincing Acha's footman to make him a loved figure in the world. Working out as he hoped, Shouhei manages to reflect one of Bara Printer's beams back at him, causing him to obsessed over him and chases him down to embrace him. After making light of Acha's plight and suggesting a honeymoon vacation, Kocha accepts Acha's pleas and blasts Bara Printer back to normal. After being weakened by Oh Green's Crusher attack, Bara Printer is defeated with the Giant Roller. Once enlarged by Kocha, Bara Printer battles Ohranger Robo and is weakened by the Horn Head configuration before being scrapped by the Crown Final Crash. Another giant Bara Printer was built to become a Super Machine Beast but was destroyed before it could become one.
 Bara Baby (バラベイビー Bara Beibī, 12): A Machine Beast sent by Bacchus Wrath in a plan to make humans hate babies, thus ensuring the end of the human race. Bara Baby performs this by shooting projecting a beam with the orb on his head, causing any baby within ideal distance to project painful sound waves upon crying that can cause mass damage. The Ohrangers battle Bara Baby as he was about to alter another baby, causing the babies he affected to cause citywide damage to cover his escape. However, Acha reveals the plan is bound to fail due to the mothers' love for their children. As a result, a change of plans is required as Bara Baby kidnaps baby Kou and places him nearby an industrial area so his cries can cause an explosion that would affect the entire city. While others fight off the Baras, Goro fights his way to Kou and saves the baby. Once Kou is given to his mother, the Ohrangers use the Big Bang Buster to take out Bara Baby. Revitalized as a giant, Bara Baby battles Ohranger Robo until he is destroyed with the Crown Final Crash.
 Bara Magma (バラマグマ Bara Maguma, 13, 33): A mining-based Machine Beast with smaller mechanoid that enables him to use his Magma Beam and Magma Missile attacks. He is sent to Mt. Fuji to make the volcano active in Buldont's scheme to destroy Tokyo. When the Ohrangers arrive, Bara Magma pursues Momo as he eludes him with the aid of Johnny. Later, Bara Magma proceeds to shove a boy Shouta into the pit as Johnny saves the boy and bites Buldont's hand in the process. As a result, Hysteria has Bara Magma kill off the dog for harming her son. Enraged, Oh Pink battles her way to Bara Magma, fighting him in spite of her injuries until the others arrives and they use the Giant Roller to defeat him. Revitalized a giant, Bara Magma battles Ohranger Robo, with Final Crown Crash finishing him off. Another giant Bara Magma was built to become a Super Machine Beast but was destroyed before it could become one.
 Bara Pinokiller (バラピノキラー Bara Pinokirā, 14): A Pinocchio-based Machine Beast created as a scheme to take out the humans while their guard is down with the mass production of Pinocchio-based robots as Juri brought a Pet Pinocchio. Donning a cloak and mask, Pinokiller attacks Goro and Juri as the others arrive, forced to run off and leave his disguise behind. While investigating the matter, Acha plants a detonation device in Juri's Pet Pinocchio in a plan to blow the UA up, with Goro chucking the robot away. Exposed, Bara Pinokiller attempts to kill everyone in the factory, including the son of the restaurant owner. When the Ohrangers arrive, Bara Pinokiller assumes his true form as Shouhei saves the people as the other Ohrangers battle Bara Pinokiller as the factory explodes. With the people running to safety, the Ohrangers defeat Bara Pinokiller with the Giant Roller as he then revitalized a giant. Forming Ohranger Robo, the Ohrangers use the Vulcan Head and Horn Head formations before using the Super Crown Sword to severe the monster's nose before being destroyed.
 Bara Revenger (バラリベンジャー Bara Ribenjā, 15): A Machine Beast formed from the collected robot pieces at Baranoia's junkyard and motivated by the grudges of every part he is composed of. Unlike the others, Bara Revenger wanted nothing to do with Baranoia other than to kill Bacchus Wrath yet his power supply is very low. After being knocked off of the moon after being unable to defeat Bacchus Wrath one on one, Bara Revenger descended onto Earth where he attempts to increase his power before he shuts down until the Ohrangers arrives on the scene as he invades them. Though distrusting him at first like others, Yuji attempts to befriend Bara Revenger as he saved a dog from being run over by a car on the street. After being saved with a Chouriki transfusion when about to shut down, Bara Revenger is astonished of the selfless act and vows to help him. However, Acha arrives and has the Baras attack Bara Revenger and Oh Blue. When the others arrive, Bacchus Wrath shows up as he has Acha implant a remote-controlled control device to force Bara Revenger into fighting the Ohrangers against his will. In spite of his attempts to snap Bara Revenger out of it, Oh Blue is forced to mortally wound him with the Giant Roller, returning him to normal as the Ohrangers vow to succeed where he failed as he limps off to a garbage dump where he shuts down and re-crumbles into spare parts.
 Bara Devil (バラデビル Bara Debiru, 16): A Machine Beast who could attack with music from the piano on his solar plexus, sent by Buldont to play his Devil World symphony to invoke natural disasters. But as Shouhei arrives, a boy named Jun comes from the future as a result of Time Split caused by the music. Because the Jun's pendant can counteract his music, Bara Devil goes after him. He enlarges as OhGreen calls for the Chouriki Mobiles, with Oh Red using the Giant Roller to free his comrade from Bara Devil's grip as Oh Green borrows Jun's pendant for Miura to analyze as Ohranger Robo battles Bara Devil. Using the Horn Head formation, Ohranger Robo forces a timeslip to occur so Jun can return to his time. With that done, Bara Devil is destroyed by with the Crown Final Crash.
 Bara Vacuum (バラバキューム Bara Bakyūmu, 17, 33): A Machine Beast brought in by Buldont to acquire Yuji's Power Brace from Seiichi Kuroda, able to suck people up into his vacuum-like tube. and use his machine forearm. After sucking Yuji in, Bara Vacuum goes after the Power Brace in a keep away until he sucks Oh Red in with the Power Brace. Once Yuji gets his Power Brace back, he and OhRed get out and fight Bara Vacuum before the Ohrangers finish him off with the Giant Roller. Once revitalize by Kocha, Bara Vacuum, Ohranger Robo uses Graviton Head formation before destroying him with the Crown Final Crash. Another giant Bara Vacuum was built to become a Super Machine Beast but was destroyed before it could become one.
 Bara Ivy (バラアイビー Bara Aibī, 18, 33): An plant-like Machine Beast that is able to burrow underground and uses his vines to attack people. Integrated into Kuroda's body, Bara Ivy kidnaps Momo, Shouhei and Juri while activating Shigeru's programming to be also integrated into Kuroda's cyborg body as well. When Shigeru breaks out of Kuroda's control, Bara Ivy disconnects from Kuroda and kills him before fighting the Ohrangers as they use the Big Bang Buster to deactivate him. Revitalized by Kocha, Bara Ivy battles Ohranger Robo and is destroyed by the Crown Final Crash. Another giant Bara Ivy was built to become a Super Machine Beast but was destroyed before it could become one.
 Bara Builder (バラビルダー Bara Birudā, 19): A giant Machine Beast Bacchus Wrath has suck up the city's electricity before fighting Ohranger Robo, displaying its abilities to self-upgrade itself to counter Ohranger Robo's abilities. Faking a surrender, Bara Builder drains Ohranger Robo of its energy before heavily damaging the giant robot. Learning of Red Puncher's existence, Bacchus Wrath attempts to stop Oh Red from getting to the new robot. But once awakened and Oh Red soothes the mecha's berserker nature, Red Puncher destroys Bara Builder with Puncher Gatling.
 Bara Boxer (バラボクサー Bara Bokusā, 20): A boxer-themed robot armed with a boxing bell mallet that Buldont had built to counter Red Puncher. First appearing in normal size, Bara Boxer proves his combat superiority to Oh Green before being enlarged to overpowers Red Puncher in what turned out to be an Exhibition Match. After being fitted with spiked boxing gloves, Bara Boxer is sent back to Earth to finish the job. But due to learning some boxing moves from Shouhei and friends, Oh Red uses Red Puncher in its full fighting potential to turn the tables before destroying Bara Boxer with Magna Puncher.
 Bara Kendama (バラケンダマ Bara Kendama, 21): Built in the likeness of the giant Kendama Robo, Bara Kendama was used by Hysteria pose as the robot when it was donated to be piloted by Oh Blue. Once the trap is sprung, Bara Kendama assumes his true face and hold Yuji hostage he goes on a rampage with Hysteria. Oh Red is powerless to fight back in the Red Puncher out of fear of killing his teammate until he leads Bara Kendama into a trap by Oh Green piloting Kendama Robo. This allows Oh Pink and Oh Yellow to get Yuji out so Red Puncher can finish the Machine Beast off with its Magna Puncher.
 Bara Madillo (バラマジロ Bara Majiro, 22): A giant armadillo-themed robot that could roll up into a spiked ball, making it nearly invulnerable to various attacks. Bara Madillo easily overpowered Ohranger Robo and Red Puncher, forcing them to attempt to form Buster Ohranger Robo. But as the two robots are unable to due to the latter's memory chip missing, Ohranger Robo and Red Puncher are forced to fall back. Learning that the chip ended up in the possession of a boy named Satoru, Bara Madillo is sent after the boy with Ohranger Robo holding the Machine Beast off while Oh Red gets Satoru to safety. But after Bacchus Wrath destroys the portable computer holding the chip, it turns out Goro got tattooed by the blast with program code on his back which Miura types into Red Puncher's programming as it is deployed. Once Buster Ohranger Robo is formed, it uses Big Cannon Burst to destroy Bara Madillo.
 Bara Clothes (バラクローズ Bara Kurōzu, 23): A silkworm-like Machine Beast who could spray silk from his mouth. After finding Buldont and Bacchus Wrath with a swimsuit issue, an upset Hysteria deploys Bara Clothes to use his powers to convert people's outfits into battle armor that allows him to control the wearers through the projection from his head. The male Ohrangers and Momo are among the affected as Juri is forced to run off after her Power Brace is taken. Though overpowered and outnumbered, Juri realized Bara Clothes' method and resorted in fighting him in a bikini as she breaks the Machine Beast's hold over her teammates. Once defeated by Ohrangers, Bara Clothes is enlarged as Ohranger Robo fights him with Red Puncher's support before they form Buster Ohranger Robo and destroy him.
 Bara Kakka (バラカッカ Bara Kakka, 24): An odd Napoleon-like robot able to assume human form, Bara Kekka arrives to Japan during Tanabata. Falling in love with Momo at first sight, having an obsession over the girl and uses his talents as a master of disguise and dimensions to cause trouble for her as he makes his declaration of love to her while assuming his true form when she turns him down. Though he had the advantage over Oh Pink and intended to boil her alive, Bara Kakka has a change of heart after Auntie stops him and puts him in his place. After freeing Momo, Bara Kakka is reminded his mission as the Ohrangers fight him before they defeat him with the Giant Roller. Enlarged, Bara Kakka battles Ohranger Robo and Red Puncher before they form Buster Ohranger Robo to finish him off.
 Bara Hungry (バラハングリー Bara Hangurī, 25): A Machine Beast with a hard body able to cover food in a mold. However, he sidetracks when he intrudes a family celebrating the father's birthday, literally eating them out of house and home before he gets drunk on sake. The Ohrangers acquire the unconscious Bara Hungry and attempt to blow him up when Acha reactivates Bara Hungry as he runs off. After a scolding from Acha, Bara Hungry resumes his plan until the Ohrangers lure him out in a festive battle. Distracted by festive dancing, Bara Hungry is tricked into drinking sake and gets too drunk to defend himself against the new Ole Bazooka. After being enlarged, Bara Hungry covers Ohranger Robo in mold before proceeding to eat it piece by piece. Again distracted, Bara Hungry is sucker punched by Red Puncher as the Machine Beast is destroyed by Buster Ohranger Robo.
 Bara Goblin (バラゴブリン Bara Goburin, 26 & 27): A Machine Beast kept in a cage by Keris as a pet, she summons Bara Goblin to handle Oh Blue, Oh Yellow, and Oh Pink while attempting to kill Dorin. But before he can get to Dorin, Riki arrives to save her. Becoming King Ranger, he uses King Victory Flash to defeats Bara Goblin before Kocha enlarges him. After overpowering Ohranger Robo and Red Puncher, Bara Goblin is easily destroyed by King Pyramider.
 Bara King (バラキング Bara Kingu, 27 & 28): Another of Keris' pets, Bara King is designed after King Ranger after she abducts him. Sent to Earth to capture little girls for his mistress' plan, Bara King is made to mess with the Ohrangers by making them think Riki is converted into a Machine Beast. But once Riki returns, the truth is revealed as King Ranger defeats Bara King. Once enlarged by Kocha, Bara King aids Keris in fighting Ohranger Robo and Red Puncher. But once King Pyramider assumes Carrier Formation, Bara King is destroyed by its barrage.
 Bara Tarantula (バラタランチュラ Bara Taranchura, 29): A tarantula-themed robot able to shrink into a spider used by Acha to implant children with receivers to make it seem that they are geniuses. The Machine Beast can also use the receivers and the mini-spiders on his body to control his targets. After getting the signal in her nephew's class, Juri and company track down Bara Tarantula's signal to his hideout. After being defeated by King Ranger and damaged by the Ole Bazooka, Bara Tarantula is enlarged by Kocha before overpowering Ohranger Robo and Red Puncher until King Pyramider intervened. In the end, Bara Tarantula is scrapped by King Pyramider Battle Formation.
 Bara Gusuka (バラグースカ Bara Gūsuka, 30): A sloth-like Machine Beast with a nightcap whose very presence and singing causes everyone around him to sleep. Though Bacchus Wrath wanted the Machine Beast scrapped for it, Hysteria suggests using him on the humans. After the Octopus he was on was shot down, Bara Gusuka manages to put the Ohrangers to sleep so Acha can kill them. However, immune to the Machine Beast's effects, King Ranger interferes and is able to scrap Bara Gusuka as he was immune. However, Henna rebuilds Bara Gusuka into a wind up lullaby machine, resuming his mission before Acha remodifies Bara Gusuka into a fighting machine with a speaker where his face used to be. While his second form was much more powerful to have King Ranger feel the effects along people far away, Bara Gusuka is stopped when Dorin has Paku bite the power cord. Rendered powerless, Bara Gusaka is taken down by the Ole Bazooka. Enlarged by Kocha, Bara Gusuka is easily scrapped by King Pyramider Battle Formation to Hysteria's dismay.
 Bara Nightmare (バラナイトメア Bara Naitomea, 32): A white robot that wields a cleaver, with the power to trap people's minds in his dream world. He defied Baranoia and fled to Earth in the year 1988, taking on a disguise of a human covered in black robes. A psychotic hebephile, he began abducting young girls he fancied and trapped their minds in his nightmare while keeping their bodies in suspended animation. This way he could watch them live out his fantasies forever. But his original victim was Momo's best friend Mayumi, and after eleven years her mind reached out to momo in dreams for help. When Momo began investigating he tried to trap her in his nightmare but was thwarted by her fellow Ohrangers. Killed by the Chouriki Dynamite Group attack, and the girls were freed to resume their stolen lives.
 Bara Mammoth (バラマンモス Bara Manmosu, 35): A giant mammoth-themed robot. First monster to be summoned by Bomber the Great. Killed by Oh Blocker.
 Machine Beast: Bara Skunk (バラスカンク Bara Sukanku, 36): A skunk-themed robot who works for Bomber the Great in creating a new Baranoia. Refer to himself as the most feared Machine Beast in the universe. He produces gas from his tail and mouth after eating garbage. This gas is so intense that instantly breaks down any material to its atomic level. Killed by OhBlocker (with the help of Tackle Boy).
 Bara Police (バラポリス Bara Porisu, 37 & 38): A police officer-themed robot. Disguising himself as a police chief, he had numerous policemen under his control. Killed by Gunmajin and OhBlocker.
 Bara Gold (バラゴールド Bara Gōrudo, 39 & 40): A golden retriever-themed robot. Last monster used by Bomber the Great. Turned anything into gold, and as it did so, it grew in size. Among things he turned into gold are OhGreen's legs and arms, as well as several parts of Blue Blocker, Pink Blocker, Yellow Blocker and Red Blocker. Everything turned to gold returned to normal after Red Puncher destroyed Bara Gold's device. Killed by King Pyramider Battle Formation.
 Bara Hunter (バラハンター Bara Hantā, 42): A robotic monster that could blast lasers from its shoulder-protruding cannon. Killed by King Pyramider Battle Formation (OhBlocker).
 Bara Fraud (バラペテン Bara Peten, 43): A robotic monster that could blast lasers from the cannon on its forehead. Killed by Oh Blocker (with the help of Tackle Boy).
 Bara Guard (バラガード Bara Gādo, 44): At first disguised himself as a dog as part of a trap. A robot monster that wielded a large bazooka-like weapon in battle. This robot could blast lasers and was very strong. Although he survives OhBlocker and Tackle Boy's attack, Bara Guard is killed by Gunmajin.
 Bara Micron (バラミクロン Bara Mikuron, 45 & 46): A centipede-like monster that used a "divide-and-conquer" tactic, breaking its body by segments which each had their own method of attack on its enemies. Could spray a beam of small dark particles to make any machine have a mind of its own, including Red Puncher and Oh Blocker, and taking away the Ohrangers' henshin powers (including King Ranger's). Killed by energy summoned by Dorin (that sent the Ohrangers in King Pyramider elsewhere) in the shape of a pyramid.
 Bara Gear (バラハグルマ Bara Haguruma, Ohranger vs. Kakuranger): Used by Bacchus Wrath in the bet he made with his son. Bara Gear is capable of placing his "Super Gears" on any machine to take it over as well as powering-up the Barlo Soldiers. He also briefly piloted Ohranger Robo after placing a gear in it. Can also attack with "Gear Bombs". He was later combined with Onbu-Bake to form Onbu-Gear (オンブハグルマ Onbuhaguruma) through their Super Machine Youkai Fusion (超マシン妖怪合体 Chō Mashin Yōkai Gattai), who was killed by Ohranger Robo, Red Puncher and Oh Blocker with Tackle Boy.
 Bara Mobile (バラモビル Bara Mobiru, CarRanger vs. Ohranger): The last of the Baranoians, he intended to enlist the aid of the Bowzock to establish his own empire of "car-people". Originally aided by the Carrangers (or specifically Kyousuke Jinnai/Red Racer) due to confusion between the teams, he soon kidnapped Goro to make him the first of his "car-people", only to be thwarted by the Carranger and Ohranger. He was able to enlarge himself without the aid of Acha and Kocha. Killed by Ohranger Robo.

Episodes

Movie
The movie version of Chouriki Sentai Ohranger, was directed by Kobayashi Yoshiaki and written by Shōzō Uehara. It premiered in Japan on April 15, 1995, at Toei Super Hero Fair '95. It was originally shown as a triple feature alongside Mechanical Violator Hakaider and the feature film version of Juukou B-Fighter.

Crossovers
 (Takes place between Episodes 33 and 34 of Chouriki Sentai Ohranger) – A 1996 direct-to-video movie which depicts a crossover between Ohranger and Ninja Sentai Kakuranger.
 (Takes place between Episodes 38 and 39 of Gekisou Sentai Carranger) – A 1997 direct-to-video crossover between Gekisou Sentai Carranger and Ohranger.

Cast
: 
: 
: 
: 
: 
: 
: , 
: 
Kotaro Henna:

Voice actors
Paku: 
: 
: 
: 
: 
: , 
: 
: 
: 
Narration:

Songs
Opening theme

Lyrics: 
Composition: 
Arrangement: 
Artist: 

Ending theme

Lyrics: Saburo Yatsude
Composition: Yasuo Kosugi
Arrangement: 
Artist: Kentarō Hayami
Episodes: 1–47

Lyrics/Composition:  (as KYOKO)
Arrangement: 
Artist: Kentarō Hayami
Episodes: 48

International Broadcasts and Home Video
The series aired in Hong Kong with a Cantonese Chinese dub on Asia Television from June 16, 1997 until October 6, 1997, with all 48 episodes dubbed.
In Thailand, the series was given a Thai dub and aired on Channel 7 in 1999 a year after Power Rangers Zeo was aired on that network and was also released on home video (VCD/DVD), distributed by Video Square and EVS Entertainment.
In Indonesia, the series aired with an Indonesian dub on RCTI in 2001 and continued re-runs until the end of 2002.
In North America, the series would receive a DVD release by Shout! Factory on November 1, 2016 in the original Japanese audio with English subtitles. It is the fourth Super Sentai series to be officially released in the region.

Notes

References

External links

 Chouriki Sentai Ohranger at the official Super Sentai website 
 Official Shout! Factory page
 Official Shout Factory TV page

1995 Japanese television series debuts
1996 Japanese television series endings
Super Sentai
Television series set in 1999
Television series set in the future
Japanese action television series
Japanese fantasy television series
Japanese science fiction television series
1990s Japanese television series
Fictional soldiers